James Caudy (1707 – March 15, 1784) was an American frontiersman, settler, and landowner in the Ridge-and-Valley Appalachians of the Colony of Virginia—present-day West Virginia. Caudy was born in the Netherlands, immigrated to the Thirteen Colonies in the 1730s, and settled within the Cacapon River valley near present-day Capon Bridge in Hampshire County. As early as 1741, Caudy was associated with the arrangement and development of transportation routes throughout present-day Hampshire County. Caudy twice hosted George Washington; first during his surveying expedition in 1748 and again upon Washington's 1750 return to the Cacapon River valley.

Caudy participated in the French and Indian War and is best known for having purportedly defended himself from a band of Native American fighters on Caudy's Castle—a sandstone outcrop that now bears his name. According to tradition, Caudy used his long rifle barrel to push his Native American attackers off the rock into the Cacapon River below. In his later life, Caudy became involved in a land dispute with John Capper that was resolved by Thomas Fairfax, 6th Lord Fairfax of Cameron in November 1762. Caudy died in 1784 and was interred on his property south of present-day Capon Bridge. According to local tradition, Caudy was buried with a Native American on either side of him, while another tradition says Caudy was buried with his horse.

Early life
James Caudy was born in 1707 in the Netherlands. He possibly arrived in the Thirteen Colonies through Prince George's County in the Province of Maryland in the 1730s. While in Prince George's County, Caudy married his first wife, Mary Hutchinson.

Settlement in Virginia 
Around 1738, Caudy and fellow frontiersman Joseph Edwards purchased tracts of land along the Cacapon River. He and Edwards were accompanied by the first two families of European descent to settle in the Cacapon River valley. Caudy's land parcel was located to the south of Edwards's ; the present-day U.S. Route 50 (Northwestern Turnpike) approximately corresponds to the boundary between Caudy's and Edwards's land parcels.

Development of transportation routes 

As early as 1741, Caudy was associated with the arrangement and development of transportation routes throughout present-day Hampshire County. On March 25, 1742, an Orange County court order mandated that Jeremiah Smith and James Eaton "view and lay" a road from Caudy's land to Isaac Perkins's mill near Winchester. That year, a wagon road was constructed between Winchester and Caudy's land tract. By 1744, this route was extended from Caudy's property to the North River at present-day North River Mills. This route later terminated at the mouth of Patterson Creek on the North Branch Potomac River and connected Winchester with Cumberland, Maryland.

In December 1742, the County Court of Orange County ordered the construction of another wagon road from Caudy's land to the South Branch Potomac River. In 1743, a wagon road connecting Winchester and Moorefield traversed Caudy's land using a ford in the Cacapon River. This road led to a watermill near Old Fields on the South Branch Potomac River. Due to the location of Caudy's settlement along the Winchester–Moorefield route, his residence served as an overnight stopping point for George Washington and George William Fairfax in April 1748. Washington and Fairfax were returning to Winchester en route to Belvoir following their surveying expedition in the South Branch Potomac River valley in present-day Hardy County. Washington and his surveying party stayed overnight in Caudy's log cabin. On April 12, 1750, George Washington surveyed a plot of "waste land" for Caudy, using white oak trees as boundary markers.

Caudy and John Stewart of Frederick County coordinated the layout and construction of further transportation routes through the region, and were respected for their efforts. Following Stewart's death in 1750, Stewart left his eldest son in the charge of Caudy and Captain Jeremiah Smith, who both procured land along the Cacapon River for him.

French and Indian War

Caudy's Castle incident 

According to local tradition and folklore, Caudy is known as an "Indian fighter". This pathway edged around the face of a rock formation overlooking the Cacapon River, and narrowed into a rocky ledge. Another legend says Caudy was leading a group of pioneer settlers in defense against Native American attacks.

In both versions of the story, Caudy awaited his pursuers within the craggy recesses of the rock formation. The narrow recesses within the pinnacle's sandstone ledges allowed only single file passage through the rock outcrop toward the formation's face. Other legends say Caudy used the tactic atop this rock on several occasions. The outcrop was named "Caudy's Castle," by which it is still known. With the exception of this event, there exist no other accounts of encounters or conflicts between Caudy and Native Americans.

French and Indian War service
During the French and Indian War, Caudy remained on his property on the Cacapon River; he staunchly defended it and likely sought further protection at Fort Edwards to the north. Caudy's residence may have been fortified; it was known as "Coddy's Fort". This fortification was not part of the "chain of forts" organized by George Washington for the defense of settlers against Native American raids in the South Branch Potomac and Cacapon River valleys. Caudy also served as a drummer in Maryland frontiersman Michael Cresap's militia.

Caudy hosted Washington again in 1755, providing Washington with an ample supply of grass seed that was likely produced in one of Caudy's fertile fields known as "Caudy's Meadow". Civil engineer Claudius Crozet later mentioned Caudy's Meadow in his fieldnotes during the planning and construction of the Northwestern Turnpike nearby. Washington sent payment for the grass seed to Caudy through James Wood, the founder of Winchester, Virginia.

Later life and death 

Caudy's claim to McCoy's land was disputed by John Capper, who claimed to have purchased McCoy's property before his death. A feud developed between Caudy and Capper; it was resolved by Thomas Fairfax, 6th Lord Fairfax of Cameron in November 1762. Lord Fairfax awarded  to Caudy and the remainder of the disputed land to Capper.

Caudy never learned to write in English; he signed his last will and testament with an X mark in 1784. Caudy died on March 15, 1784, and was interred on his property south of present-day Capon Bridge. According to local tradition, Caudy was buried with a Native American on either side of him. Another tradition says he was buried with his horse. The site of Caudy's interment is located on property now known as Hartford Bealer farm. In the 1930s, Caudy's burial site was attended to by a local Boy Scouts troop, who landscaped the site and planted shrubbery. By 1976, Caudy's burial place was marked with four posts. In 2002, the Capon Bridge Ruritan Club removed the overgrown shrubs and erected a white fence around Caudy's interment site. The project was initiated by Capon Bridge area residents Roy Giffin, Ken Edmonds, and Roberta Munske. The Ruritans purchased a marble marker and erected it on the site at 9 a.m. on November 15, 2003. The burial site is accessible and visible from Christian Church Road, West Virginia Secondary Route 13.

Marriages and issue
Caudy's first marriage was to Mary Hutchinson in Prince George's County, Maryland. He and Mary had five children together:
 David Caudy (died in November 1782), married Martha Hiett
 Ann Caudy Dulany, married a Mr. Dulany
 Margaret Caudy Wood, married Daniel Wood
 Mary Caudy Kinman, married Samuel Kinman
 Sarah Caudy Hancher, married John Hancher

By 1761, Caudy had married the widow of James McCoy, who lived across Great North Mountain in Frederick County.

Footnotes

References

Bibliography

External links 
 
 
 

1707 births
1784 deaths
18th-century American landowners
18th-century Dutch people
American drummers
Burials in West Virginia
Dutch emigrants to the Thirteen Colonies
People from Hampshire County, West Virginia
People from Prince George's County, Maryland
People of Virginia in the French and Indian War
Virginia colonial people
West Virginia colonial people
West Virginia pioneers